The 1959–60 season was the 87th season of competitive football in Scotland and the 63rd season of the Scottish Football League.

Scottish League Division One

Champions: Hearts
Relegated: Stirling Albion, Arbroath

Scottish League Division Two

Promoted: St Johnstone, Dundee United

Cup honours

Other honours

National

County

 – aggregate over two legs – replay (won on corners) – trophy shared

Highland League

Scotland national team

Key:
 (H) = Home match
 (A) = Away match
 BHC = British Home Championship

Notes and references

External links
Scottish Football Historical Archive

 
Seasons in Scottish football